The Church of St Lawrence in Westbury-sub-Mendip, Somerset, England was built in the 12th century. It is a Grade II* listed building.

History

The church was built in the 12th century and then changed in the 13th and 15th centuries before a major Victorian restoration in 1887, when the tower was completely rebuilt.

In 2012 a small kitchen was installed in the church. Also in 2012 an antique table and chest were stolen from the church.

The benefice of Westbury-sub-Mendip with Easton is part of the Diocese of Bath and Wells.

Architecture

The stone building consists of a nave and chancel  each of three bays, with an aisle, transept and porch on the south side. The organ chamber and vestry are on the north. The two-stage unbuttressed west tower has a small perpendicular stair turret.

Some of the fitting inside the church are from the 13th century including the piscina and font.

See also  
 List of ecclesiastical parishes in the Diocese of Bath and Wells

References

Grade II* listed buildings in Mendip District
Grade II* listed churches in Somerset